Marcus Fairs (27 November 1967 – 30 June 2022) was a British editor. He was the founder and editor of the online design magazine Dezeen and the founding editor of the British architecture and design magazine Icon.

References

1967 births
2022 deaths
British editors